The 2019 Wimbledon Championships was a Grand Slam tennis tournament that took place at the All England Lawn Tennis and Croquet Club in Wimbledon, London, United Kingdom. The main tournament began on Monday 1 July 2019 and finished on Sunday 14 July 2019.

The defending gentlemen's singles champion Novak Djokovic retained his title, while the defending ladies' singles champion Angelique Kerber lost in the second round to Lauren Davis. Simona Halep won the ladies' singles title. This was the first Grand Slam tournament where both singles titles were won by players born in the Balkans.

This was the first edition of the tournament to feature a standard tie break in the final set when the score in the set was 12 games all. The winner was the first player or pair to reach seven points whilst leading by two or more points or, in the case of a 6-6 point score, to establish a subsequent lead of two points. Henri Kontinen and John Peers won the first such tie break played in Wimbledon history, defeating Rajeev Ram and Joe Salisbury in a third-round men's doubles match. In men's singles, the only such match was the final in which Novak Djokovic defeated Roger Federer, in what was also the longest final in tournament history lasting for 4 hours and 58 minutes.

Women's singles included 16 qualifiers from 128 entrants, an increase from 12 qualifiers from 96 entrants. Doubles qualifying was eliminated as a result. The change brought the qualification for the women's singles into line with that for the men's singles, which remained unchanged.

This was the last edition of the Wimbledon Championships until 2021 after the event would be cancelled in 2020 due to the COVID-19 pandemic.

Tournament 

The 2019 Wimbledon Championships was the 133rd edition of the tournament and was held at All England Lawn Tennis and Croquet Club in London. It was also the last regular tennis tournament to be staged before the cancellation was confirmed in 2020, due to the COVID-19 pandemic, the first such cancellation since World War II.

The tournament was run by the International Tennis Federation (ITF) and was included in the 2019 ATP Tour and the 2019 WTA Tour calendars under the Grand Slam category. The tournament consisted of men's (singles and doubles), women's (singles and doubles), mixed doubles, boys (under 18 – singles and doubles) and girls (under 18 – singles and doubles), which was also a part of the Grade A category of tournaments for under 18, and singles & doubles events for men's and women's wheelchair tennis players as part of the UNIQLO Tour under the Grand Slam category, also hosting singles and doubles events for wheelchair quad tennis for the first time.

The tournament was played only on grass courts; main draw matches were played at the  All England Lawn Tennis and Croquet Club, Wimbledon. Qualifying matches were played, from Monday 24 June to Thursday 27 June 2019, at the Bank of England Sports Ground, Roehampton. The Tennis Sub-Committee met to decide wild card entries on 17 June.

Singles players

Gentlemen's singles

Ladies' singles

Events

Gentlemen's singles 

  Novak Djokovic def.  Roger Federer, 7–6(7–5), 1–6, 7–6(7–4), 4–6, 13–12(7–3)

Ladies' singles 

  Simona Halep def.  Serena Williams, 6–2, 6–2

Gentlemen's doubles 

  Juan Sebastián Cabal /  Robert Farah def.  Nicolas Mahut /  Édouard Roger-Vasselin, 6–7(5–7), 7–6(7–5), 7–6(8–6), 6–7(5–7), 6–3

Ladies' doubles 

  Hsieh Su-wei /  Barbora Strýcová def.  Gabriela Dabrowski /  Xu Yifan, 6–2, 6–4

Mixed doubles 

  Ivan Dodig /  Latisha Chan def.  Robert Lindstedt /  Jeļena Ostapenko, 6–2, 6–3

Wheelchair gentlemen's singles 

  Gustavo Fernández def.  Shingo Kunieda, 4–6, 6–3, 6–2

Wheelchair ladies' singles 

  Aniek van Koot def.  Diede de Groot, 6–4, 4–6, 7–5

Wheelchair quad singles 

  Dylan Alcott def.  Andrew Lapthorne, 6−0, 6−2

Wheelchair gentlemen's doubles 

  Joachim Gérard /  Stefan Olsson def.  Alfie Hewett /  Gordon Reid, 6−4, 6−2

Wheelchair ladies' doubles 

  Diede de Groot /  Aniek van Koot  def.  Marjolein Buis /  Giulia Capocci, 6−1, 6−1

Wheelchair quad doubles 

  Dylan Alcott /  Andrew Lapthorne def.  Koji Sugeno /  David Wagner, 6–2, 7–6(7–4)

Boys' singles 

  Shintaro Mochizuki def.  Carlos Gimeno Valero, 6–3, 6–2

Girls' singles 

  Daria Snigur def.  Alexa Noel, 6−4, 6−4

Boys' doubles 

  Jonáš Forejtek /  Jiří Lehečka def.  Liam Draxl /  Govind Nanda, 7−5, 6−4

Girls' doubles 

  Savannah Broadus /  Abigail Forbes def.  Kamilla Bartone /  Oksana Selekhmeteva, 7–5, 5–7, 6–2

Gentlemen's invitation doubles 

  Arnaud Clément /  Michaël Llodra def.  Xavier Malisse /  Max Mirnyi, 6–3, 1–6, [10–7]

Ladies' invitation doubles 

  Cara Black /  Martina Navratilova def.  Marion Bartoli /  Daniela Hantuchová, 6–0, 3–6, [10–8]

Senior gentlemen's invitation doubles 

  Jonas Björkman /  Todd Woodbridge def.  Jacco Eltingh /  Paul Haarhuis, 4−6, 6−3, [10−6]

Singles seeds

Gentlemen's singles 
Seeds are adjusted on a surface-based system to reflect more accurately the individual player's grass court achievement as per the following formula, which applies to the top 32 players according to the ATP rankings on 24 June 2019:
 Take Entry System Position points at 24 June 2019.
 Add 100% points earned for all grass court tournaments in the past 12 months (25 June 2018 – 23 June 2019).
 Add 75% points earned for best grass court tournament in the 12 months before that (26 June 2017 – 24 June 2018).

Rank and points before are as of 1 July 2019.

† The player did not qualify for the tournament in 2018, but is defending points from an ATP Challenger Tour tournament.

The following player would have been seeded, but withdrew before the event.

Ladies' singles 
The seeds for ladies' singles are based on the WTA rankings as of 24 June 2019. Rank and points before are as of 1 July 2019.

† The player did not qualify for the tournament in 2018. Accordingly, points for her 16th best result are deducted instead.

The following player would have been seeded, but withdrew from the event.

Doubles seeds

Gentlemen's doubles 

1 Rankings are as of 24 June 2019.

Ladies' doubles 

1 Rankings are as of 24 June 2019.

Mixed doubles 

1 Rankings are as of 1 July 2019.

Point distribution and prize money

Point distribution 
Below is the tables with the point distribution for each phase of the tournament.

Senior points

Wheelchair points

Junior points

Prize money 
The total prize money on offer has increased for the eighth year in a row. Winners of the tournament will get the largest share of the £38m pot, up from £34m last year (+11.8%).

* per team

Main draw wildcard entries 
The following players will receive wild cards into the main draw senior events.

Gentlemen's singles 
  Marcos Baghdatis
  Jay Clarke
  Paul Jubb
  Dominik Köpfer
  Feliciano López
  James Ward

Ladies' singles 
  Harriet Dart 
  Monica Niculescu
  Katie Swan

Gentlemen's doubles 
  Liam Broady /  Scott Clayton
  Jay Clarke /  James Ward
  Jack Draper /  Paul Jubb
  Dan Evans /  Lloyd Glasspool
  Lleyton Hewitt /  Jordan Thompson
  Evan Hoyt /  Luke Johnson

Ladies' doubles 
  Naiktha Bains /  Naomi Broady
  Freya Christie /  Katie Swan
  Harriet Dart /  Katy Dunne
  Sarah Beth Grey /  Eden Silva

Mixed doubles 
  Jay Clarke /  Coco Gauff
  Scott Clayton /  Sarah Beth Grey
  Evan Hoyt /  Eden Silva
  Jonny O'Mara /  Naomi Broady
  Joe Salisbury /  Katy Dunne

Main draw qualifier entries

Gentlemen's singles 

  Corentin Moutet 
  Yasutaka Uchiyama 
  Andrea Arnaboldi
  Alexei Popyrin
  Kwon Soon-woo 
  Thiago Monteiro 
  Jiří Veselý
  Salvatore Caruso
  Marcel Granollers 
  Marcos Giron 
  Kamil Majchrzak 
  Grégoire Barrère 
  Noah Rubin 
  Dennis Novak
  Yūichi Sugita 
  Ruben Bemelmans 
Lucky loser
  Brayden Schnur

Ladies' singles 

  Cori Gauff 
  Tereza Martincová
  Kristie Ahn
  Arina Rodionova
  Anna Kalinskaya
  Kaja Juvan
  Caty McNally
  Varvara Flink
  Paula Badosa
  Giulia Gatto-Monticone
  Elena-Gabriela Ruse 
  Ysaline Bonaventure
  Ana Bogdan
  Beatriz Haddad Maia
  Lesley Kerkhove
  Yanina Wickmayer

Lucky losers
  Marie Bouzková
  Lauren Davis
  Christina McHale

Protected ranking
The following players were accepted directly into the main draw using a protected ranking:

 Gentlemen's Singles
  Tomáš Berdych (PR 57)
  Steve Darcis (PR 90)
  Jozef Kovalík (PR 85)
  Vasek Pospisil (PR 73)
  Cedrik-Marcel Stebe (PR 95)
  Janko Tipsarević (PR 88)

 Ladies' Singles
  Anna-Lena Friedsam (PR 50)
  Shelby Rogers (PR 81)

Withdrawals 
The following players were accepted directly into the main tournament but withdrew with injuries or other reasons:

 Gentlemen's Singles
  Borna Ćorić → replaced by  Brayden Schnur
  Juan Martín del Potro → replaced by  Paolo Lorenzi
  Mackenzie McDonald → replaced by  Denis Istomin

 Ladies' Singles
  Bianca Andreescu → replaced by  Kristýna Plíšková
  Dominika Cibulková → replaced by  Marie Bouzková
  Ekaterina Makarova → replaced by  Svetlana Kuznetsova
  Evgeniya Rodina → replaced by  Lauren Davis
  CoCo Vandeweghe → replaced by  Ivana Jorović
  Vera Zvonareva → replaced by  Christina McHale

References

External links 
 

 
Wimbledon Championships
Wimbledon Championships
Wimbledon Championships
Wimbledon Championships
Wimbledon Championships
Wimbledon Championships